Yves Hyacinthe Deniaud (December 11, 1901 – December 7, 1959) was a French comic actor.

Born in Paris, Deniaud died in Vésinet, in 1959.

Selected filmography
 Women's Prison (1938)
 People Who Travel (1938)
 Coral Reefs (1939)
 Latin Quarter (1939)
 Radio Surprises (1940)
 The Mondesir Heir (1940)
 Tobias Is an Angel (1940)
 The Benefactor (1942)
 Goodbye Leonard (1943)
 A Woman in the Night (1943)
 Domino (1943)
 Night Shift (1944)
 Fantômas (1946)
 The Ideal Couple (1946)
 Jericho (1946)
 Lessons in Conduct (1946)
 Not So Stupid (1946)
 Barry (1949)
 The Lovers Of Verona (1949)
 Millionaires for One Day (1949)
 The Heroic Monsieur Boniface (1949)
 A Man Walks in the City (1950)
 Dr. Knock (1951)
 The Sleepwalker (1951)
 Monsieur Leguignon, Signalman (1952)
 The Smugglers' Banquet (1952)
 The Lottery of Happiness (1953)
 The Porter from Maxim's (1953)
 Leguignon the Healer (1954)

Filmography

1936: Le Crime de Monsieur Lange (dir. Jean Renoir) (uncredited)
1936: Rigolboche (dir. Christian-Jacque) as Le caissier du Gloria (uncredited)
1937: Drôle de drame (dir. Marcel Carné) as Policeman
1938: Je chante (dir. Christian Stengel) as The butcher
1938: Prisons de femmes (dir. Maurice Lehmann, Claude Autant-Lara) as Victor
1938: Le Ruisseau (dir. Maurice Lehmann et Claude Autant-Lara) (uncredited)
1938: Les Gens du voyage (dir. Jacques Feyder) as Le bonimenteur
1939: Angélica (dir. Jean Choux)
1939: Le Récif de corail (dir. Maurice Gleize) as The seller in the bazaar
1939: Le Déserteur (dir. Léonide Moguy)
1939: La Tradition de minuit (dir. Roger Richebé) as Le bonimenteur (uncredited)
1939: Latin Quarter (dir. Pierre Colombier, Christian Chamborant, Alexander Esway) as Napoléon
1939: Dernière Jeunesse (dir. Jeff Musso) as Reynaud
1940: L'Héritier des Mondésir (dir. Albert Valentin) as Gaston
1940: Les Surprises de la radio (dir. Marcel Aboulker) as the first duelist
1940: Tobie est un ange (dir. Yves Allégret)
1942: Signé illisible (dir. Christian Chamborant) as Tatave
1942: L'Appel du bled (dir. Maurice Gleize) as The Arabic seller
1942: Le Bienfaiteur (dir. Henri Decoin) as Vinchon
1942: Lettres d'amour (dir. Claude Autant-Lara) as The Mayor
1943: Une femme dans la nuit (dir. Edmond T. Gréville) as Maxime
1943: Le Comte de Monte-Cristo "Edmond Dantès" (dir. Robert Vernay) as Pénelan
1943: Départ à zéro (dir. Maurice Cloche) as Jules
1943: Les Deux Timides (dir. Yves Allégret) as Le commis-voyageur
1943: A la belle frégate (dir. Albert Valentin) as Raoul
1943: Des jeunes filles dans la nuit (dir. René Le Hénaff) as The client of the visionary
1943: Domino (dir. Roger Richebé) as Mirandole
1943: Adieu Léonard (dir. Pierre Prévert) as Leon, The waiter
1943: Feu Nicolas (dir. Jean Faurez) as Rigaud
1944: Cécile est morte (dir. Maurice Tourneur) as Machepied
1944: Service de nuit (dir. Jean Faurez) as Victor
1944: La Vie de plaisir (dir. Albert Valentin) as Gaston
1944: Florence est folle (dir. Georges Lacombe) as Bianco
1945: Comédiens ambulants (Short, dir. Jean Canolle) as Le presenter
1945: Fausse Alerte (tourné en 1940) (dir. Jacques de Baroncelli) as Le peddler
1945: L'Extravagante Mission (dir. Henri Calef) as Gilbert, "Patte de velours"
1945: La Part de l'ombre (dir. Jean Delannoy) as Auguste
1946: Jéricho (dir. Henri Calef) as Robert Detaille
1946: Leçon de conduite (dir. Gilles Grangier) as Angelo
1946: Le Couple idéal ou "Voyage au pays des loufoques", "Diavolo contre Judex" (dir. Bernard Roland) as Julien
1946: La Foire aux chimères (dir. Pierre Chenal) as The intermediary
1946: Pas si bête (dir. André Berthomieu) as Antony
1947: La Colère des dieux (dir. Carl Lamac) as Truche
1947: L'Arche de Noé (dir. Henri Jacques) as Maclou
1947: Fantomas (dir. Jean Sacha) as Arthur
1947: Carré de valets (dir. André Berthomieu) as Jules
1948: L'Idole (dir. Alexander Esway) as Al Simon
1948: L'Armoire volante (dir. Carlo Rim) as Martinet
1949: Jean de la Lune (dir. Marcel Achard) as Le colonial dans le train (uncredited)
1949: Le Signal rouge (dir. Ernst Neubach) as The tramp
1949: Fantomas Against Fantomas (dir. Robert Vernay) as L'ordonnateur
1949: Les amants de Vérone (dir. André Cayatte) as Ricardo
1949: La Bataille du feu ou Les Joyeux Conscrits (dir. Maurice de Canonge) as Sergeant Poirier
1949: Barry (dir. Richard Pottier) as Le sergent Brocard, "Lafleur"
1949: Barry, moines du Mont Saint-Bernard (version Suisse du film précédent) (dir. Karl Anton et Richard Pottier) as Le sergent Brocard, "Lafleur"
1949: L'Héroïque Monsieur Boniface (dir. Maurice Labro) as gangster #1
1949: Appel d'Yves Deniaud (Short documentary) (anonyme) as himself
1949: On demande un assassin (dir. Ernst Neubach) as Tom
1949: Millionnaires d'un jour (dir. André Hunebelle) as Antoine Bergas, the tramp
1949: Monseigneur (dir. Roger Richebé) as Bouaffre, le patron serrurier
1949: Séraphins et truands (Short, dir. René Sti)
1950: Le 84 prend des vacances (dir. Léo Joannon) as Jules Laplanche
1950: Au p'tit zouave (dir. Gilles Grangier) as Henri
1950: Un homme marche dans la ville (dir. Marcello Pagliero) as Albert
1950: Les Femmes sont folles (dir. Gilles Grangier) as Hector Robilleau
1951: Le Roi des camelots (dir. André Berthomieu) as Gaston
1951: La rose rouge (dir. Marcello Pagliero) as Albert
1951: La Peau d'un homme (dir. René Jolivet) as Daniel Mareuil
1951: Knock (dir. Guy Lefranc) as Le tambour de ville
1951: Boniface somnambule (dir. Maurice Labro) as René, the gangster
1951: La Maison Bonnadieu (dir. Carlo Rim) as Mouffe
1951: Les Deux Gosses (I due derelitti) (dir. Flavio Calvazara) as Lumaca
1952: Le Banquet des fraudeurs (dir. Henri Storck) as Brigadier Achille Van Moll
1952: Monsieur Leguignon Lampiste (dir. Maurice Labro) as Diogène Leguignon, lampiste
1952: Ouvert contre X (dir. Richard Pottier) as Inspector Bonnardel
1952: Mon curé chez les riches (dir. Henri Diamant-Berger) as Abbé Pellegrin
1952: La Bergère et le Ramoneur dessin animé (dir. Paul Grimault) as police (voice)
1953: La Loterie du bonheur (dir. Jean Gehret) as Léon Lucas
1953: Le Chasseur de chez Maxim's (dir. Henri Diamant-Berger) as Julien Pauphilat
1953: Autant en emporte le gang (dir. Jacques Moisy et Michel Gast) (voice)
1954: L'Étrange Désir de monsieur Bard (dir. Geza Radvanyi) as Antonio, l'ami de M. Bard
1954: Si Versailles m'était conté (dir. Sacha Guitry) as The farmer
1954: Crainquebille (dir. Ralph Habib) as Crainquebille, marchand des quatre saisons
1954: Leguignon guérisseur (dir. Maurice Labro) as Diogène Leguignon
1954: Huis clos (dir. Jacqueline Audry) as Le garçon d'étage
1955: Fantaisie d'un jour (dir. Pierre Cardinal) as Papa Bénard
1955: Les Chiffonniers d'Emmaüs (dir. Robert Darène) as Djibouti
1955: Le Couteau sous la gorge (dir. Jacques Séverac) as Commissaire Lucas
1955: On déménage le colonel (dir. Maurice Labro) as Roméo
1956: Mon curé chez les pauvres (dir. Henri Diamant-Berger) as Abbé Pellegrin
1956: Le Colonel est de la revue (dir. Maurice Labro) as Calla, le mari de Cora
1957: Ce joli monde (dir. Carlo Rim) as Pepito, chef de bande
1957: Quand la femme s'en mêle (dir. Yves Allégret) as Bobby
1958: Les Copains du dimanche (film qui n'est jamais sorti en salle) (dir. Henri Aisner) as The old workman
1958: La Moucharde (dir. Guy Lefranc) as Parola
1958: Sérénade au Texas (dir. Richard Pottier) as Roderick, le saltimbanque
1958: Nuits de Pigalle (dir. Georges Jaffe) as Boursier (final film role)

 Television 
 1955 : Monsieur Brotonneau by François Gir – Mr Brotonneau 1956 : Affaire vous concernant by Claude Loursais
 1958 : Là-haut by Jean-Paul Carrère
 1959 : L'Ange de miséricorde by François Gir

 Theatre 
 1942 : Colinette by Marcel Achard, mise en scène Pierre Dux, Théâtre de l'Athénée
 1952 : Madame Filoumé by Eduardo De Filippo, mise en scène Jean Darcante, Théâtre de la Renaissance
 1957 : La Guerre du sucre'' by Robert Collon, mise en scène Yves Allégret, Théâtre des Bouffes-Parisiens

1901 births
1959 deaths
French comedians
French male film actors
French male stage actors
French male television actors
Male actors from Paris
20th-century French male actors
20th-century French comedians